Massachusetts House of Representatives' 3rd Essex district in the United States is one of 160 legislative districts included in the lower house of the Massachusetts General Court. It covers part of the city of Haverhill in Essex County. Democrat Andy Vargas of Haverhill has represented the district since 2017.

The current district geographic boundary overlaps with that of the Massachusetts Senate's 1st Essex district.

Representatives
 Francis M. Dodge, circa 1858 
 Robert S. Rantoul, circa 1858 
 James Hill, circa 1859 
 Thomas A. Morgan, circa 1859 
 Albert L. Dame, circa 1888 
 William H. Poore, circa 1888 
 Essex S. Abbott, circa 1920 
 Katherine Alena Foley, 1935-1938
 Charles H. Anthony, circa 1951 
 Charles Sumner Marston, 3rd, circa 1951

Former locales
The district previously covered:
 Lawrence, circa 1872 
 Methuen, circa 1872

See also
 List of Massachusetts House of Representatives elections
 Other Essex County districts of the Massachusetts House of Representatives: 1st, 2nd, 4th, 5th, 6th, 7th, 8th, 9th, 10th, 11th, 12th, 13th, 14th, 15th, 16th, 17th, 18th
 Essex County districts of the Massachusett Senate: 1st, 2nd, 3rd; 1st Essex and Middlesex; 2nd Essex and Middlesex
 List of Massachusetts General Courts
 List of former districts of the Massachusetts House of Representatives

Images

References

External links
 Ballotpedia
  (State House district information based on U.S. Census Bureau's American Community Survey).

House
Government of Essex County, Massachusetts